Cliniodes semilunalis is a moth in the family Crambidae. It was described by Heinrich Benno Möschler in 1890. It is found in southern Brazil, north to northern Goiás.

The length of the forewings is 12–16 mm for males and 17–20 mm for females. The forewing costa is orange brown and the basal area is orange brown with white scales. The medial area is grey with orange-brown scales and the postmedial and terminal areas are reddish brown. The hindwings are translucent white with a dark brown marginal band. Adults have been recorded on wing in May, September and November.

References

Moths described in 1890
Eurrhypini